Sarah Goldberg (born May 31, 1985) is a Canadian actress. She is best known for her role as Sally Reed in the HBO dark comedy series Barry (2018–2023), which earned her a nomination for the Primetime Emmy Award for Outstanding Supporting Actress in a Comedy Series. She also originated the dual role of Betsey/Lindsey in the Royal Court Theatre's production of Clybourne Park, for which she was nominated for a 2011 Olivier Award, and later performed it on Broadway.

Early life
Goldberg was born into a Jewish family in Vancouver, British Columbia, on May 31, 1985. Attracted to the theater, she participated in productions in high school. After backpacking through Europe, she was accepted to the London Academy of Music and Dramatic Art (LAMDA) in 2004 and subsequently moved to London. She worked as a waitress and babysitter to support herself and graduated in 2007.

Career
Shortly after graduating, Goldberg gained her first role in a production of Carson McCullers' The Member of the Wedding at the Young Vic. She also did voice-overs, motion capture for video games, and instructional videos. She was cast in Apologia at the Bush Theatre in 2009, and also appeared in Bekah Brunstetter's Miss Lilly Gets Boned at the Finborough Theatre and John Guare's Six Degrees of Separation at the Old Vic.  In 2011, she was cast in a supporting role in Bruce Norris' Clybourne Park at the Royal Court, originating the dual role of Betsey/Lindsey. She was nominated for an Olivier Award for her performance, and later performed the play on Broadway. She portrayed Alison Porter in Sam Gold's off-Broadway 2012 revival of John Osborne's Look Back in Anger, opposite Adam Driver and Matthew Rhys, and then appeared in Amy Herzog's The Great God Pan at Playwrights Horizons. 

Goldberg had small parts in the films A Bunch of Amateurs (2008), Gambit (2012), and The Dark Knight Rises (2012). She also starred in the short-lived comedy-drama series Hindsight (2015). She began playing aspiring actress Sally Reed in the HBO dark comedy series Barry (2018–present), for which she was nominated for the Primetime Emmy Award for Outstanding Supporting Actress in a Comedy Series in 2019.

Filmography

Film

Television

Stage

Awards and nominations

References

External links 
 

Canadian voice actresses
Canadian film actresses
Jewish Canadian actresses
Canadian stage actresses
Living people
1985 births
Actresses from Vancouver
21st-century Canadian actresses
Alumni of the London Academy of Music and Dramatic Art